This article presents a list of the historical events and publications of Australian literature during 1905.

Books 

 Louis Becke – The Adventures of a Supercargo
 Randolph Bedford – The Snare of Strength
 Rolf Boldrewood – The Last Chance: A Tale of the Golden West
 Guy Boothby 
 A Brighton Tragedy
 In Spite of the Czar
 The Stolen Peer
 Mary Grant Bruce – A Little Bush Maid
 Tom Collins – Rigby's Romance
 G. B. Lancaster – The Spur to Spite
 Rosa Praed 
 The Lost Earl of Ellan
 The Maid of the River
 Ethel Turner – A White Roof-Tree

Short stories 

 Guy Boothby – A Crime of the Under Seas, and Other Stories
 Edward Dyson – "A Little Love Affair"
 Joseph Furphy – "The Jeweller's Shop"

Poetry 

 Arthur A. D. Bayldon – The Western Track and Other Verses
 Victor J. Daley 
 "The Call of the City"
 "The Great Secret"
 "St. Francis II"
 Ernest Favenc – Voices of the Desert
 Mabel Forrest – "The Other Side"
 Henry Lawson – When I Was King and Other Verses 
 Louisa Lawson – The Lonely Crossing and Other Poems
 Dorothy Frances McCrae – "The Treasure"
 Hugh McCrae – "Australian Spring"
 A.B. Paterson 
 "Lay of the Motor Car"
 Old Bush Songs: Composed and Sung in the Bushranging, Digging and Overlanding Days (ed.)
 "Saltbush Bill, J.P."
 Catherine Helen Spence – "Australian Spring"
 Ethel Turner – "A Boat on the Sea"

Biography 

 Mrs Aeneas Gunn – The Little Black Princess: A True Tale of Life in the Never-Never Land

Births 

A list, ordered by date of birth (and, if the date is either unspecified or repeated, ordered alphabetically by surname) of births in 1905 of Australian literary figures, authors of written works or literature-related individuals follows, including year of death.

 1 April – Paul Hasluck, poet and journalist (died 1993)
 10 April – Norma L. Davis, poet (died 1945)
 7 July – Martin Haley, poet and translator (died 1980)
 28 August – Len Fox, journalist, historian, social activist and painter (died 2004)
 28 December – Leslie Rees, journalist and writer for children (died 2000)

Deaths 

A list, ordered by date of death (and, if the date is either unspecified or repeated, ordered alphabetically by surname) of deaths in 1905 of Australian literary figures, authors of written works or literature-related individuals follows, including year of birth.

 26 February – Guy Boothby, novelist (born 1867)
 29 December – Victor J. Daley, poet (born 1858)

See also 
 1905 in poetry
 List of years in literature
 List of years in Australian literature
 1905 in literature
 1904 in Australian literature
 1905 in Australia
 1906 in Australian literature

References

Literature
Australian literature by year
20th-century Australian literature